The 1963 Tennessee Volunteers football team (variously "Tennessee", "UT" or the "Vols") represented the University of Tennessee in the 1963 NCAA University Division football season. Playing as a member of the Southeastern Conference (SEC), the team was led by head coach Jim McDonald, in his first and only year, and played their home games at Neyland Stadium in Knoxville, Tennessee. They finished the season with a record of five wins and five losses (5–5 overall, 3–5 in the SEC).

Schedule

Team players drafted into the NFL

References

Tennessee
Tennessee Volunteers football seasons
Tennessee Volunteers football